A brush hook (also called a bush hook, brush axe, ditch blade, ditch bank blade, or ditch blade axe) is a gardening instrument resembling an axe, generally with a  to  curved blade and a  to  handle.  It is commonly used by surveying crews and firefighters to clear out heavy undergrowth from trails, as well as by homeowners and gardeners to clear thick brush.

See also
Kaiser blade
Billhook
Slasher (tool)

References

Gardening tools